Harry Dennis may refer to:
Harry Dennis (footballer)
Harry Dennis (musician)

See also
Henry Dennis (disambiguation)